Charles Curtis is a performer and composer of a wide variety of music, with particular emphasis on the avant-garde. Curtis is most strongly associated with minimalism, modern classical, and so-called "downtown music."

A graduate of Juilliard School, Curtis has since been involved with the music department at Princeton University and at the University of California, San Diego. He has served as Professor of Contemporary Music Performance at UCSD since 2000, where he serves as artistic director for the chamber music series Camera Lucida. 

Curtis has studied under such masters as vocalist Pandit Pran Nath and composer La Monte Young and still regularly records and performs. He has also worked closely with composers such as Eliane Radigue and Alvin Lucier.

Selected discography

External links
Charles Curtis bio on UCSD faculty page
Charles Curtis main page at Squealer Music
Biography at Kunst im Regenbogenstadl

American cellists
Living people
King Missile members
University of California, San Diego faculty
Year of birth missing (living people)